The King's Man is a 2021 spy action film directed by Matthew Vaughn from a screenplay by Vaughn and Karl Gajdusek and a story by Vaughn. The third installment in the British Kingsman film series, which is based on the comic book The Secret Service (later retitled to Kingsman) by Mark Millar and Dave Gibbons, it is a prequel to Kingsman: The Secret Service (2014) and Kingsman: The Golden Circle (2017). Its ensemble cast includes Ralph Fiennes (also one of its executive producers), Gemma Arterton, Rhys Ifans, Matthew Goode, Tom Hollander, Harris Dickinson, Daniel Brühl, Djimon Hounsou, and Charles Dance. It focuses on several events during World War I and the birth of the Kingsman organisation.

It was released in the United States on 22 December 2021, and in the United Kingdom on 26 December 2021 by 20th Century Studios, delayed several times from an original November 2019 release date, partially due to the COVID-19 pandemic. It received mixed reviews from critics, grossing $126 million against nearly a $100 million budget making it a box-office bomb.

Plot
In 1902, aristocrat Orlando, Duke of Oxford, his wife Emily, and their young son Conrad visit a  concentration camp in  South Africa while working for the British Red Cross. Emily is mortally wounded during a Boer sniper attack on the camp. Before passing, she makes Orlando promise never to let their son see war again.

Twelve years later, Orlando has formed a private spy network of domestic servants (including his servants, Shola and Polly) employed by the world's most powerful dignitaries. The network's primary goal is to protect the United Kingdom and the British Empire from the approaching  Great War. Conrad is eager to fight, but Orlando forbids him to join the British Army and persuades  Lord Kitchener, Secretary of State for War, not to let him do so.

At Kitchener's request, Conrad and Orlando ride with Orlando's friends, Archduke Franz Ferdinand of Austria and his wife Sophie, Duchess of Hohenberg, through Sarajevo. Conrad saves the Archduke from a bomb thrown by Gavrilo Princip, a Young Bosnia rebel intent on sparking a war. Princip later reencounters the Archduke's entourage by chance and fatally shoots him and his wife. Orlando learns that the assassination was orchestrated by "The Flock": a group plotting to pit the  German,  Russian, and British empires against each other. The Flock's headquarters is on an isolated clifftop, led by the mysterious "Shepherd", whose ultimate goal is to achieve Scottish independence; its operatives include Russian mystic Grigori Rasputin, trusted adviser to  Tsar Nicholas of Russia.

On the Shepherd's orders, Rasputin poisons Nicholas's young son Alexei, only to cure him when Nicholas promises to stay out of the war. Conrad is notified of Rasputin's manipulation by his cousin, Prince Felix Yusupov. Knowing the Western Front will be left vulnerable if Russia exits the war, Conrad delivers this information to Kitchener and his aide-de-camp Major Max Morton, who set sail for Russia. Their ship, is torpedoed by a submarine and sunk. Word of Kitchener's death reaches Orlando, spurring him to travel to Russia with Shola, Polly, and Conrad to kill Rasputin. After a grueling fight, Orlando, Shola, Conrad, and Polly successfully kill Rasputin at a Christmas party hosted by Felix. After celebrating his 19th birthday, Conrad expresses his determination to join the army, much to Orlando's dismay.

The Shepherd orders Erik Jan Hanussen, an adviser to  Kaiser Wilhelm II, to send the Zimmermann Telegram, hoping to distract Britain and the United States. Although British Intelligence intercepts the message and Polly deciphers it, American President Woodrow Wilson refuses to join the war, citing a lack of concrete proof. The Shepherd recruits Vladimir Lenin and orders his Bolsheviks to  overthrow the Tsar and remove Russia from the war, sending an assassin to  execute the Romanov family.

Conrad is commissioned into the Grenadier Guards against his father's wishes.  King George V persuades Orlando to let him have Conrad assigned to London. Determined to fight in the war, Conrad swaps places with a soldier named Archie Reid, giving him the nickname "Lancelot" to send his father a message. Disguised as Archie, a member of the Black Watch, Conrad volunteers for a mission into No-Man's Land to retrieve information from a British agent wounded there. He is mistaken for a German spy upon his return and shot in the head, devastating Orlando, but the information he recovered verifies the authenticity of the Zimmermann Telegram.

After Wilson again refuses to enter the war despite Conrad's proof, Orlando learns that Wilson is being blackmailed with footage of being seduced by the Shepherd's agent, Mata Hari, and resolves to recover the original negatives. Upon defeating Hari at the American embassy, Orlando has her cashmere wool scarf identified as made from a rare breed only found in a specific mountainous region. Orlando, Shola, and Polly head there and fight their way inside. The Shepherd is revealed to be Morton, who had faked his death and killed Kitchener himself. Orlando fights and kills Morton with the help of Shola. At the same time, Polly recovers the film and delivers it to Wilson, who burns it and prepares to mobilize the United States for war.

A year after the war, Orlando purchases the  Kingsman Tailor Shop as a front for his organization. Orlando, Shola, Polly, King George, Archie, and the  U.S. Ambassador to the U.K. form the original Kingsmen, each assuming codenames from the King Arthur legend to honour Conrad. 

In a  mid-credit scene, Hanussen, having taken on the Shepherd identity, introduces Lenin to the Romanovs' killer: a young Adolf Hitler.

Cast

Production

Development 
In June 2018, Matthew Vaughn announced that a prequel film titled Kingsman: The Great Game was in active development, stating that the plot would take place during the early 1900s and would depict the formation of the spy agency and that the project would film back-to-back with "the third regular Kingsman film" which was scheduled to be released in 2021.

Casting 
In September 2018, it was announced that Ralph Fiennes and Harris Dickinson would star in the prequel with the former also serving as one of the executive producers of the film. In November 2018, it was revealed that Daniel Brühl, Charles Dance, Rhys Ifans and Matthew Goode would co-star in the film.
 
In February 2019, it was reported that Aaron Taylor-Johnson, Gemma Arterton, Tom Hollander, Djimon Hounsou, Alison Steadman, Stanley Tucci, Robert Aramayo and Neil Jackson had joined the cast. In April 2019, it was announced Alexandra Maria Lara had joined the cast of the film. Later in May, Joel Basman joined the cast. That same month, as filming concluded, Vaughn denied reports that Liam Neeson had joined the cast. Vaughn also said The Great Game was a working title and the film would not have that name.

Filming 
Principal photography began 22 January 2019 in the United Kingdom. In April 2019, some scenes were shot in Piedmont, Italy: Turin, Po river's street, street of city and in two palaces close to it; Venaria Reale: the Palace of Venaria and royal gardens; Nichelino, Palazzina di caccia of Stupinigi and surroundings; Racconigi (Cuneo), Castle of Racconigi. The film's initial cinematographer Ben Davis had to depart the project during reshoots due to his commitments to Eternals.

Release
The King's Man had its world premiere in London, United Kingdom on 5 December 2021 and was theatrically released on 22 December 2021, its eighth proposed release date and more than two years after it was originally due to come out.

It was originally scheduled to be released on 8 November 2019, but was pushed back first to 15 November 2019, then to 14 February 2020, and then to 18 September 2020. The release date was again pushed back by Walt Disney Studios Motion Pictures to 26 February 2021, due to the COVID-19 pandemic. Following the delay of Marvel Cinematic Universe: Phase Four films, The King's Man was moved up two weeks to 12 February 2021, before being moved again to 12 March 2021. In January 2021, the release date was delayed again to 20 August 2021. In March 2021, it was further delayed to the December 2021 date. The film played in cinemas for 45 days before heading to digital platforms.

Home media
The film started streaming on Disney+ through Star in the UK, Ireland, Japan, and South Korea on 9 February 2022 and much later that February for Australia and New Zealand and Canada. It streamed on HBO Max and Hulu on 18 February and on Star+ on 2 March. The film streamed on Disney+ Hotstar on 23 February 2022 in Southeast Asia. The film was released on Blu-ray, DVD, and 4K Ultra HD by 20th Century Studios Home Entertainment on 22 February.

Soundtrack 

Matthew Margeson, who worked with Henry Jackman in the previous Kingsman films, composed the film score with Dominic Lewis. Hollywood Records released the soundtrack digitally on 22 December 2021. The ending theme is "Measure of a Man" by FKA Twigs featuring Central Cee.

Reception

Audience viewership 
According to Samba TV, 2.2 million US households watched The King's Man during its first four days streaming. According to Whip Media, The King's Man was the most watched film across all platforms in the United States, during the week of February 20, 2022. According to the streaming aggregator JustWatch, The King's Man was the top-streamed movie across all platforms during the week of February 21, 2022.

Box office 
The King's Man grossed $37.2million in the US and Canada, and $88.8million in other territories, for a worldwide total $126million.

In the US and Canada, The King's Man was released alongside Sing 2 and The Matrix Resurrections. It was originally projected to gross $15–20 million from 3,175 screens over its first five days of release. It went on to under-perform, grossing $5.9 million in its opening weekend and an estimated $10 million over the five days, finishing fifth at the box office, with contributing factors such as the reluctance to go to cinemas during the pandemic, the rise of the Omicron variant of COVID and being released during the second weekend of Spider-Man: No Way Home. Men made up 65% of the audience during its opening, with those in the age range of 18–34 comprising 54% of ticket sales and those above 35 comprising 40%. The film earned $4.6 million in its second weekend, $3.2 million in its third, $2.2 million in its fourth, $1.8 million in its fifth, $1.66 million in its sixth, $1.2 million in its seventh, and $426,262 in its eighth.

Outside the US and Canada, the film earned $6.9 million in its opening weekend, including $3.5 million in South Korea, $2.1 million in Japan, and $600,000 in Indonesia. In its second weekend, the film made $14.1 million from 22 markets. In Taiwan, the film opened with $2.8 million, making it the fourth-best opening of 2021 in the country. In its third weekend, the film earned $13.4 million, including $1.6 million from Germany, where it debuted in second place at the box office. The film made $10.2 million in its fourth weekend, $6.2 million in its fifth, $4.2 million in its sixth, and $2.7 million in its seventh.

Critical response 
The site's critical consensus reads, "Ralph Fiennes' solid central performance in The King's Man is done dirty by this tonally confused prequel's descent into action thriller tedium." On Metacritic, which uses a weighted average, the film has a score of 44 out of 100, based on 40 critics, indicating "mixed or average reviews". Audiences polled by CinemaScore gave the film an average grade of "B+" on an A+ to F scale, while PostTrak reported 77% of audience members gave it a positive score, with 60% saying they would definitely recommend it.

Possible sequel 
Matthew Vaughn stated that if a sequel were to be developed, he would like to see the story about the first decade of the Kingsman agency with all of the characters that the audience sees at the end. According to the Hollywood Reporter, he said:

References

External links 
 
 

2021 films
2021 action comedy films
2020s spy comedy films
American action comedy films
American historical action films
American historical comedy films
American spy action films
American spy comedy films
American World War I films
British action comedy films
British spy action films
British spy comedy films
British historical action films
British historical comedy films
British World War I films
20th Century Studios films
Rating controversies in film
Obscenity controversies in film
Cultural depictions of Archduke Franz Ferdinand of Austria
Cultural depictions of George V
Cultural depictions of Herbert Kitchener, 1st Earl Kitchener
Cultural depictions of Vladimir Lenin
Cultural depictions of Mata Hari
Cultural depictions of Nicholas II of Russia
Cultural depictions of Grand Duchess Anastasia Nikolaevna of Russia
Cultural depictions of Gavrilo Princip
Cultural depictions of Wilhelm II
Cultural depictions of Woodrow Wilson
Cultural depictions of Adolf Hitler
2020s English-language films
Fictional intelligence agencies
Film spin-offs
Films about Grigori Rasputin
Films about intelligence agencies
Films about nobility
Films about royalty
Films about the assassination of Archduke Franz Ferdinand of Austria
Films directed by Matthew Vaughn
Films produced by Matthew Vaughn
Films scored by Matthew Margeson
Films scored by Dominic Lewis
Films set in Austria-Hungary
Films set in London
Films set in Sarajevo
Films set in South Africa
Films set in the British Empire
Films set in the German Empire
Films set in the Russian Empire
Films set in the White House
Films set in 1902
Films set in 1914
Films set in the 1910s
Films shot in Turin
Films shot in London
Films shot in Surrey
Films impacted by the COVID-19 pandemic
Films postponed due to the COVID-19 pandemic
Kingsman (franchise) films
Prequel films
Second Boer War films
TSG Entertainment films
Western Front (World War I) films
World War I spy films
2020s American films
American prequel films
British prequel films
Secret histories